Wakefield is in Wakefield parish in Carleton County, New Brunswick.

Wakefield is located on Route 103 between Somerville, Richmond, Woodstock, Brighton, Simonds, Wilmot, Lakeville, Hartland, and Maine. The Hartland Bridge, the longest covered bridge in the world, is located in nearby Hartland on the Saint John River.

History

Notable people

See also
List of communities in New Brunswick

References

Communities in Carleton County, New Brunswick